Severnaya Verf is a major shipyard on  in Saint Petersburg, Russia, producing naval and civilian ships. It was founded as a branch of the Putilov Plant in the late 1800s. Under the Soviets, the shipyard was generally known as Shipyard No. 190 (in the name of Zhdanov) and reverted to its former name in 1989.

The priority market for Severnaya Verf is military export to Asian countries as India, China and Vietnam.

History 
The shipyard was established by 1912 with the name of Putilov Shipyard (Russian: Putilovskaya Verf). It was situated near the main Putilov factory, and began building small warships, up to destroyers in size, in addition to non-military ships for the government like dredgers, tugboats, etc. Under Bolshevik control it was known as the Severnaya Verf and was then renamed Severnaya sudostroitel'naya verf in the early Twenties. It was given the honorific "in the name of Zhdanov" in 1935 and was renamed as Shipyard No. 190 (in the name of Zhdanov) when the Soviets numbered most of their industrial facilities on 30 December 1936. During this time, the yard built its only submarines; notably several Shchuka and M-class boats as well as components for S-class submarines that were assembled in Vladivostok in the Far East. Badly damaged during World War II by the Germans, the shipyard was rebuilt and enlarged after the war, partially by using plundered equipment and machines from Germany, and specialized in larger surface warships up to cruiser size. As of 1983 about one-third of its output was commercial ships. The shipyard reverted to its earlier name of Severnaya Verf on 2 August 1989. It is now part of the Severnaya Verf Production Association.

Facilities and services 

As of 1998, the shipyard included:

Slipways are equipped with cranes with a lifting capacity of 50 tons;
 launch-hoisting facilities with floating dock that has a lifting capacity of 10,000 tons and a transborder, which is able to launch and hoist vessels from and to any slipway.
 new closed drydock (or slipway) 270 x 150 x 78 m for large vessels , under completation

Notable classes and vessels

See also 
 List of ships of Russia by project number

Notes

Bibliography

External links 
 Official site

Severnaya Verf
Severnaya Verf
Severnaya Verf
Severnaya Verf
Companies nationalised by the Soviet Union
Companies formerly listed on the Moscow Exchange